The list of ship decommissionings in 1877 includes a chronological list of all ships decommissioned in 1877.


References

See also 

1877
 Ship decommissionings